Maguireothamnus is a genus of flowering plants belonging to the family Rubiaceae.

Its native range is the Guyana Highlands, between Guyana and Venezuela.

The genus name of Maguireothamnus is in honour of Bassett Maguire (1904–1991), an American botanist, head curator of the New York Botanical Garden, and a leader of scientific expeditions to the Guyana Highlands in Brazil and Venezuela. 
It was first described and published in Mem. New York Bot. Gard. Vol.10 (Issue 5) on page 220 in 1964.

Known species
According to Kew:
Maguireothamnus speciosus 
Maguireothamnus tatei

References

Rubiaceae
Rubiaceae genera
Plants described in 1845
Flora of Guyana
Flora of Venezuela